Belomitra leobrerorum is a species of sea snail, a marine gastropod mollusc in the family Belomitridae.

Original description
  Poppe G. & Tagaro S. (2010) New species of Haloceratidae, Columbellidae, Buccinidae, Mitridae, Costellariidae, Amathinidae and Spondylidae from the Philippines. Visaya 3(1):73-93.

References

External links
 Worms Link

Belomitridae